Jeon Do-yeon (born February 11, 1973) is a South Korean actress. She won Best Actress at the 60th Cannes Film Festival, making her the second Korean actress to win an acting award at a prestigious film festival, and Best Performance by an Actress at the 1st Asia Pacific Screen Awards for her performance in Lee Chang-dong's 2007 film Secret Sunshine. Although she is not as broadly popular with the audiences as some other stars in South Korea due to her film choices, Jeon is widely respected and celebrated for her acting abilities, and many young actresses have cited her as a role model.

Early life
Jeon Do-yeon was born on February 11, 1973. She has two older brothers and is the youngest in her family. Born and raised in Seoul, she graduated from Bukgajwa Elementary School, Yeonhee Girls Middle School, Changduk Girls High School and Department of Broadcasting at Seoul Institute of the Arts.

Career

1990–1997: Beginnings and breakthrough
In 1990, Jeon made her debut in the entertainment industry as an advertisement model for Johnson & Johnson. She made her acting debut in television series Our Heaven in 1992. She then continued to play supporting roles in Scent of Love (1994) and General Hospital (1994) and Love is Blue (1995), but struggled to receive any significant attention. In 1995, she gained some recognition after playing the heroine's younger sister in KBS2's hit drama Our Sunny Days of Youth, which recorded its highest viewership rating of 62.7 percent. The drama's director, Jeon San PD, made a remark stating that Jeon Do-yeon is a "tough and ambitious newcomer". The following years, she played major roles in multiple dramas such as Project, Way Station and Until We Can Love in 1996, and Star in My Heart in 1997. Jeon spent five years starring in television dramas before achieving instant star status with her feature film debut acting alongside Han Suk-kyu in 1997 film The Contact, which became the second-highest grossing Korean film of that year. She won numerous awards through the work, including Best New Actress at the 35th Grand Bell Awards and 18th Blue Dragon Film Awards.

1997–2006: Critical acclaim and success
From 1997 after the success of The Contact, Jeon emerged as a prominent actress in the Korean film industry and went on to establish a reputation as a "chameleon" who can take on a wide variety of roles, from her performance as a doctor in the hit melodrama A Promise, which won her Best Actress at the 35th Baeksang Arts Awards, to that of a schoolgirl in the 1999 film The Harmonium in My Memory, then a wife having an adulterous affair in the 1999 film Happy End. In 1999 and 2000, she received Best Actress awards at numerous award ceremonies such as the 20th Blue Dragon Film Awards and the 37th Grand Bell Awards for her performance in The Harmonium in My Memory. She also won Best Actress at the 35th Baeksang Arts Awards for her role in A Promise and several other local film awards for her role in Happy End.

In 2001, she played a bank teller in Park Heung-sik's directorial debut I Wish I Had a Wife. After starring as the tough-talking Soo-jin in Ryoo Seung-wan's No Blood No Tears in 2002, Jeon spent time acting in the television series Shoot for the Stars. In 2003, she found box-office success in E J-yong's Untold Scandal, an adaptation of the famous French novel Dangerous Liaisons set in Joseon. The following year, she reunited with director Park Heung-sik in a dual role for the time-bending melodrama film My Mother, the Mermaid.

In 2005, Jeon played a prostitute who contracts AIDS in Park Jin-pyo's hard-hitting melodrama You Are My Sunshine. The film was a box-office hit, and her performance received critical acclaim and won her numerous acting awards. She then returned to the small screen with Lovers in Prague, a drama that tells the love story between the president's daughter and an ordinary detective. The drama was a huge success, with average viewership ratings of over 27 percent. For the work, Jeon won the Grand Prize (Daesang) at 2005 SBS Drama Awards. Commenting on her successful year, The Korea Herald noted, "It is rare for a movie and a drama with the same leading actor or actress to become major hits at the same time. And often, actors and actresses avoid such cases, due to the risk of confusing audiences, but Jeon managed to pull both roles off perfectly without causing any confusion in the audience."

2007–2014: Secret Sunshine and international acclaim

In 2007, Jeon starred in Lee Chang-dong's melodrama Secret Sunshine, which propelled her to international recognition. Her fierce and fearless portrayal of a widowed mother who struggles to rearrange her life after the tragic deaths of her husband and son received universal critical acclaim. Although the film itself, which debuted at the 60th Cannes Film Festival, evoked widely differing assessments from international critics, Jeon's performance was universally praised, and she was chosen as the Best Actress by the Cannes jury, making her the first Korean ever to receive an acting award at Cannes. She also won Best Performance by an Actress at the 1st Asia Pacific Screen Awards. Following the heel of the Cannes' win, Jeon went on to sweep domestic awards, winning Best Actress at multiple film award ceremonies such as the 28th Blue Dragon Film Awards. In recognition of her contribution to the development of the Korean film industry, she was honored with the Okgwan Order of Cultural Merit by the Ministry of Culture, Sports and Tourism and the Special Achievement Award at the 44th Grand Bell Awards.

Post-Cannes, she starred in 2008 film My Dear Enemy, playing an unemployed single woman who reacquaints herself with her ex-boyfriend. After starring in My Dear Enemy, Jeon gave birth to a daughter and rested for a while. In October 2009, she was honored by the French government with the Chevalier des Arts et Lettres medal for her contribution to the arts. The following year, she returned to star in Im Sang-soo's 2010 controversial remake The Housemaid. Jeon came back to Cannes once again as the film was chosen to compete for the Palme d'Or at the 63rd Cannes Film Festival.

In 2011, Jeon played a female con artist who risks her life for ten days for a final deal with a cold-hearted debt collector in Countdown. Countdown premiered at the 36th Toronto International Film Festival.

In 2013, after a two-year break, Jeon returned with Bang Eun-jin's Way Back Home, a film based on the true story of a housewife who was imprisoned for two years on the island of Martinique after being wrongly arrested for drug smuggling at Paris's Orly Airport in 2004. In 2014, she was announced as one of the nine panel members of the main competition jury at the 67th Cannes Film Festival, making her the first Korean actor or actress to receive the honor and the second Korean after director Lee Chang-dong in 2009.

2015–present: Further acclaim and return to the small screen
In 2015, Jeon starred in The Shameless, a thriller that explores the unexpected and carnal attraction that develops between a detective and the girlfriend of the murderer that he investigates. The film was selected for the Un Certain Regard section at the 68th Cannes Film Festival and Jeon returned to Cannes for the fourth time in her career. For her performance in the film, Jeon won Best Actress at the 24th Buil Film Awards, the 15th Director's Cut Awards, and the 52nd Baeksang Arts Awards respectively. The same year, she played a blind swordswoman in the Goryeo-set revenge period drama Memories of the Sword, her third collaboration with Park Heung-sik and her second with Lee Byung-hun.

This was followed by Jeon's second film with director Lee Yoon-ki, A Man and a Woman, a 2016 film about a forbidden romance that takes place in the snow-swept landscape of Finland. Jeon then made a return to the small screen after twelve years in the 2016 Korean remake of the American legal drama The Good Wife. She was praised for displaying a wide range of emotions and agony of a housewife who is forced to become a lawyer again after her husband is mired in a scandal and put behind bars.

After a three-year break, Jeon reunited with Sol Kyung-gu in drama film Birthday, marking her second collaboration with Sol eighteen years after I Wish I Had a Wife. The film, inspired by the Sewol ferry disaster, deals with the struggles faced by a couple who lost their son in a tragic accident. The film had its international premiere at the 2019 Far East Film Festival in Udine, Italy. At the festival, Jeon was honored with Golden Mulberry Lifetime Achievement Award. She once again won Best Actress at the 56th Baeksang Arts Awards, the 6th Korean Film Producers Association Awards and 28th Buil Film Awards for her performance in the film.

In early 2020, Jeon starred in Beasts Clawing at Straws, a mystery thriller based on Keisuke Sone's novel, alongside Jung Woo-sung. The film was screened at the 49th International Film Festival Rotterdam and won the Special Jury Award in the Tiger Competition. The film failed to turn a profit as local box office sales plummeted due to the COVID-19 pandemic.

She made her small-screen comeback in Hur Jin-ho's first television series project Lost which premiered on JTBC in September 2021. In 2022, she reunited with Song Kang-ho and Lee Byung-hun in Han Jae-rim's disaster action film Emergency Declaration.

In 2023, Jeon acts opposite Jung Kyung-ho in tvN-broadcast Netflix-distributed romantic comedy series Crash Course in Romance directed by Yoo Je-won, which marked her return to romance genre in 17 years. She played the role of a former national handball player who now runs a banchan shop, raising her high school daughter alone. According to Good Data Corporation, series Crash Course in Romance ranked first with a topical share of 23.8% in Top 10 of TV Topicality Ranking in drama division category in four weeks in a row. Jung Kyung-ho ranked first in the performer category for five consecutive weeks, while Jeon ranked 3rd.

In the same year, Jeon stars in Netflix crime action film Kill Boksoon in the titile role, as a professional assassin, opposite Sol Kyung-gu, Esom, and Koo Kyo-hwan. Directed and written by Byun Sung-hyun, it is slated to release on Netflix on March 31, 2023.

Personal life
Jeon married businessman and professional car racer Kang Shi-kyu, who is nine years her senior, in a private wedding ceremony at Shilla Hotel on March 11, 2007. She gave birth to a daughter on January 22, 2009.

Filmography

Film

Television series

Music video

Theater

Awards and nominations

Notes

References

External links
 
 
 

1973 births
20th-century South Korean actresses
21st-century South Korean actresses
Living people
South Korean film actresses
South Korean stage actresses
South Korean television actresses
Cannes Film Festival Award for Best Actress winners
Best Actress Asian Film Award winners
Recipients of the Order of Cultural Merit (Korea)
Seoul Institute of the Arts alumni
Korea University alumni
People from Seoul
Blue Dragon Film Award winners
Asia Pacific Screen Award winners
Best Actress Paeksang Arts Award (film) winners